Strastnoy Boulevard is a 1999 Russian drama film directed by Vladimir Khotinenko. It was entered into the 21st Moscow International Film Festival where it received a Special Mention.

Cast
 Sergey Koltakov as Andrei Sokolov
 Vladimir Ilyin as Dukin
 Nina Usatova as Dukin's wife, actress dolls
 Sergey Garmash as writer
 Sergey Parshin as passenger
 Yelena Starodub as  Andrei Sokolov's former wife
 Ivan Bortnik  as   man by the fire

References

External links
 

1999 films
1999 comedy-drama films
Russian comedy-drama films
1990s Russian-language films
Films directed by Vladimir Khotinenko